Gracia Putri Raemawasti Mulyono (born 5 December 1986, in Blitar, East Java) is Indonesian public figure and journalist and beauty pageant titleholder who won the title of Puteri Indonesia 2007 (Miss Indonesia Universe 2007) from East Java. She has attended the Institut Teknologi Sepuluh Nopember, Surabaya, majoring in industrial engineering.

Pageantry

Puteri Indonesia 2007 
Raemawasti represented the province of East Java in the Puteri Indonesia 2007 national beauty contest, Raemawasti was crowned Puteri Indonesia 2007 at the finals held at the Jakarta Convention Center, on 3 August 2007, by the outgoing titleholder of Puteri Indonesia 2006, Agni Pratistha Arkadewi Kuswardono of Central Java. She was successfully selected as the winner of Miss Universe Indonesia. The final coronation night was graced by the reigning Miss Universe 2007, Riyo Mori of Japan.

Miss Universe 2008
Raemawasti represented Indonesia at the Miss Universe 2008, but was unplaced. At the Miss Universe, she was the first Miss Indonesia to wear a two-piece bathing suit rather than the usual maillot one piece during the final presentation show.

See also

 Puteri Indonesia 2007
 Miss Universe
 Miss Universe 2008
 Duma Riris Silalahi

References

External links

 Official Puteri Indonesia Official Website
 Official Miss Universe Official Website
 

Living people
1986 births
Indonesian beauty pageant winners
Indonesian Christians
Indonesian television presenters
Indonesian women television presenters
Javanese people
Puteri Indonesia winners
Miss Universe 2008 contestants
People from Blitar
Sepuluh Nopember Institute of Technology alumni